Chembra is a village situated in Naluthara pocket in Mahé district of Puducherry, India.

It is part of Mahé municipality.

Villages in Mahe district